A yacht club is a sports club specifically related to yachting.

Description
Yacht clubs are mostly located by the sea, although there some that have been established at a lake or riverside locations. Yacht or sailing clubs have either a marina or a delimited section of the beach or shoreline with buoys marking the areas off-limits for swimmers as well as safe offshore anchorages. On shore they also include a perimeter reserved for the exclusive use of the members of the club as well as a clubhouse with attached bar, café or restaurant where members socialize in a pleasant and informal setting.

Although the terms Yacht Club and Sailing Club tend to be synonymous, some general differences regarding the recreational use of boats can be broadly outlined. Historically a Yacht Club tended to focus on a membership composed of yacht owners, including motorboats. This type of club often was extremely exclusive, attracting the aristocracy or the high class and leaving small boat owners out of the circle. On the other hand, a Sailing Club tended to focus on a membership composed exclusively of owners of sailboats, including smaller boats such as dinghies. These became very popular towards the end of the 19th century when small boats began to be produced on an industrial scale.

Yacht clubs are often known by their initials (e.g. New York Yacht Club abbreviated as NYYC and Kingston Yacht Club abbreviated as KYC). Many well known yacht clubs, including the Yacht Club de France, the Yacht Club Italiano and the Royal Yacht Squadron, have been established under royal patronage or have been granted the title at some point in their history.

Organized and run by the membership, Yacht Clubs became a place to promote the sport of sailboat racing and cruising, as well as provide a meeting place for the particular social community. The membership is a mixture of people with specific recreational affinities, and the members often include those who sail as crew for cruising or racing, as well as boat owners. Also it is up to the members decide on the objectives of the club to satisfy the membership and to attract other like-minded individuals. For example, some clubs include owners of powerboats, while others specifically exclude them. In order to overcome difficulties concerning the affinities of their members one particular club may have two sections, a sailing section and a powerboat section.

Members Clubs often have paid staff for catering, bar duty, boat yard duty, accounts, office etc. Control and organization of the club is done for the membership via members elected by the membership into roles such as Sailing Secretary, Commodore, Cruising Captain, Racing Captain etc. Smaller clubs typically have a condition of membership which requires active participation of the membership in activities such as maintenance of club facilities and equipment.

Unlike the classical clubs where the membership is the focus, certain 'clubs' are run on a commercial basis. They may be owned by individuals or a company to provide a service and generate a profit. Often they are associated with a particular marina or port. Objectives are usually broadly similar to members clubs, but the social side may be more dominant.

Traditions

There is a long historical tradition behind yacht clubs. According to the date of establishment, the Neva Yacht Club, founded in 1718 in Russia, is the oldest yacht club. However, since this Russian Yacht Club was established by a decree of Tsar Peter the Great, it does not fully qualify as a proper club in the modern sense, understood as a voluntary association of members who organize and run the club. Therefore, the Royal Cork Yacht Club founded in Ireland in 1720 is also widely acknowledged as the oldest yacht club in the world, despite having gone through periods of dormancy and undergone name changes in its long history, much in the same manner as the Neva Yacht Club. It was only in 1846 that the first yacht club in Russia to adopt British-style Members Club regulations was established. Using this Western understanding of what a club or society is, the Royal Swedish Yacht Club, KSSS, founded 1830, becomes the oldest European yacht club outside the British Isles, and the fifth oldest in the world.

A number of the world's most renowned Yacht Clubs are located in the United Kingdom, Australia, Germany, Canada, and the United States. The first yacht club in North America was the Royal Nova Scotia Yacht Squadron, located on the Northwest Arm in Halifax, Nova Scotia, Canada established in July 1837. Some yacht clubs are affiliated with an international body, the International Council of Yacht Clubs, which exists to improve the quality of the services yacht clubs provide to their members as well as to promote environmental awareness and responsibility towards the environment.

The Kieler Yacht-Club in Northern Germany organizes the yearly Kiel Week, the second-biggest sailing event in the world, that is celebrated since 1882. Kiel Week was an attempt to imitate the much older and larger Cowes Week, long-admired by Wilhelm II.

Racing and sailing activities

Most clubs, regardless of the size of their craft, have a well defined racing program. Clubs may host regattas ranging from informal local events to national championships. Often clubs have a regular weekday evening racing schedule or a weekend racing schedule organized by the membership. Many yacht clubs field teams to compete against other clubs in team racing. There are also some specific boat models and lengths which have their own club. These boat ownership clubs often hold single design races for their members. With the growth of sailing at secondary schools and universities many yacht clubs host Interscholastic Sailing Association or Intercollegiate Sailing Association regattas. Additionally, a number of yacht clubs enter into agreements with schools to provide dock space and practice facilities for the school teams year-round.

Clubs with active adult sailing programs most often feature junior sailing programs as well. Most often these programs enroll children from ages 8 to 16. Children most often learn to sail in the optimist (dinghy) and then progress to a larger single handed dinghy such as starling or laser dinghy or two handed such as 420 (dinghy). These junior sailing programs often also teach children rowing, kayaking, general seamanship and navigation. Children are also taught how to race competitively from an early age and most clubs host junior sailing regattas each season.

Yacht club burgee

Members belonging to a yacht club or sailing organization may fly their club's unique flag (usually triangular), called a burgee, both while under way and at anchor (however, not while racing). Traditionally, the burgee was flown from the main masthead, however it may also be flown from a small pole on the bow pulpit, or on the starboard rigging beneath the lowest starboard spreader on a flag halyard. Some traditional clubs have also been granted the right to fly a special yacht ensign at the stern.

At traditional clubs the burgee and the ensign is hoisted at 08:00 each morning and lowered each evening at sunset. This ceremony is called colors. Traditionally, the first time a member of one club visits another, there is an exchange of burgees. Exchanged burgees are often displayed on the premises of clubs, such as at their clubhouse or bar.

Organization

Yacht clubs are organized like any other club or organisation with committees, chairman, directors, etc. Due to the connection with the sea and hence the navy, the various posts use naval terminology. For example, the chairman/CEO is the Commodore. Usually, under the Commodore there are also the Vice Commodore (in charge of land-based activities) and the Rear Commodore (in charge of water-based activities); for clubs in the United States they might in turn be assisted by the Port Captain and the Fleet Captain respectively. In a few clubs in the United Kingdom the Admiral, which is one rank above the Commodore, is the senior officer. Each of these ranks has specific responsibilities to ensure the smooth running of the club.

Clubhouse or shore station
Members of yacht clubs typically gather at a clubhouse or shore station which may also have docks. The oldest yacht club in the world without a clubhouse is Sheldrake Yacht Club (Mamaroneck, New York).

Use of the term "yacht club"

The traditions and prestige normally associated with yacht clubs have to some extent been subverted or appropriated unofficially by groups and businesses calling themselves "yacht clubs". For example, the "Gowanus Yacht Club" is a beer garden restaurant in Brooklyn, NY, the Van Buren Yacht Club is a bar and hotel in Maine, the "Crystal Bay Yacht Club" is a beach resort in Ko Samui, Thailand and "The Eagle Rock Yacht Club" is a non-profit dodgeball league in Glassell Park, Los Angeles.  These so-called "yacht clubs" don't necessarily involve sailing on private yachts of members as their main purpose or activity, but often outwardly maintain a nautical or water-oriented theme.

Tonkin Gulf Yacht Club was the unofficial name for the United States Seventh Fleet during the Vietnam War. In this case the term "yacht club" was appropriated with humorous intentions. The Seventh Fleet's nickname became very popular among its members at the time.

Oldest European clubs
The oldest yacht clubs are:
1718 Neva Yacht Club in	St. Petersburg, Russia.
1720 Royal Cork Yacht Club	in Cork, Ireland
1770 Lough Ree Yacht Club	in Ballyglass, Ireland
1772 Starcross Yacht Club	on the Exe estuary in England
1775 Cumberland Fleet  also known as the Royal Thames Yacht Club,  in	England
1815 The Yacht Club in London, England, renamed the Royal Yacht Squadron in 1833
1823 Thames Yacht Club in	England
1827 Port of Plymouth Royal Clarence Regatta Club in Plymouth, England, becoming the Royal Western Yacht Club in 1833
1827 Royal Western Yacht Club of Ireland dissolved later in the century  
1830 Royal Swedish Yacht Club in Stockholm, Sweden
1831 Royal Irish Yacht Club in Dun Laoghaire, Dublin, Ireland
1835 Lough Derg Yacht Club Co. Tipperary, Ireland
1838 Royal St. George Yacht Club (founded as the Kingstown Boat Club) in Dun Laoghaire, Ireland
1838 Deben Yacht Club in Woodbridge, United Kingdom
1844 Royal Mersey Yacht Club in Rock Ferry, United Kingdom
1845 Royal Harwich Yacht Club in England
1847 Royal Welsh Yacht Club in Wales
1847 Koninklijke Nederlandsche Zeil en Roei Vereeniging, Netherlands
1855 Segelclub Rhe in Hamburg, Germany
1856 Lisbon Naval Association in Lisbon, Portugal
1857 Kingstown Model Yacht Club in Kingstown, Ireland, renamed the Royal Alfred Yacht Club in 1870
1858 Società delle Regate in Belgirate, Italy
1860 Royal Windermere Yacht Club in England 
1863 Royal Torbay Yacht Club in Devon, England
1865 Airisto Segelsällskap in Turku, Finland
1866 Royal Danish Yacht Club in Kopenhagen, Denmark
1867 Berliner Yacht Club in Berlin, Germany
1867 Balatonfüredi Yacht Club in Balatonfüred, Hungary
1870 Thames Sailing Club in England 
1871 National Yacht Club (founded as Kingstown Royal Harbour Boat Club) in Dun Laoghaire, Dublin, Ireland
1875 Black Sea Yacht Club in Odessa, Ukraine

Oldest North American clubs
The oldest yacht clubs are:
1837 Royal Nova Scotia Yacht Squadron in Halifax, Nova Scotia
1839 Detroit Boat Club in Detroit, Michigan.
1844 New York Yacht Club in Newport, Rhode Island
1847 Mobile Yacht Club in Mobile, Alabama
1849 Biloxi Yacht Club in Biloxi, Mississippi
1849 Southern Yacht Club in Louisiana
1850 Springfield Yacht & Canoe Club in Springfield, Massachusetts
1852 Royal Canadian Yacht Club in Toronto, Ontario
1853 Carolina Yacht Club in Wrightsville Beach, NC
1857 Maryland Club in Baltimore, Maryland
1860 Buffalo Yacht Club in Buffalo, New York
1861 Quebec Yacht Club in Quebec, Quebec
1865 Raritan Yacht Club in Perth Amboy, New Jersey
1865 Riverton Yacht Club in Riverton, New Jersey
1867 Longueuil Boating Club in Longueuil, Quebec
1869 San Francisco Yacht Club, first club on the Pacific coast
1871 Milwaukee Yacht Club, in Milwaukee, Wisconsin
1877 New Bedford Yacht Club, in New Bedford, Massachusetts
1879 Monmouth Boat Club, in Red Bank, New Jersey
1883 American Yacht Club, in Rye, New York
1886 Shelter Island Yacht Club, in Shelter Island, New York
1887 Lake Champlain Yacht Club, Shelburne, Vermont
1890 Tacoma Yacht Club, in Tacoma, Washington 
1891 Manhasset Bay Yacht Club, in Port Washington, New York 
1894 Huguenot Yacht Club, in New Rochelle, New York
1907 Sheldrake Yacht Club, in Mamaroneck, New York

Oldest clubs rest of the world
1826 Republic of Singapore Yacht Club, Singapore
1849 Royal Hong Kong Yacht Club, Hong Kong
1862 Royal Sydney Yacht Squadron, Australia
1865  Royal Perth Yacht Club, Australia
1871 Royal New Zealand Yacht Squadron, New Zealand
1883 Clube Naval de Luanda, Angola

See also
List of yacht clubs
Yachting

References

External links 

 
Russian inventions
Irish inventions